Beeston and Holbeck is an electoral ward of Leeds City Council in Leeds, West Yorkshire, covering the inner city areas and urban suburbs of Beeston, Cottingley and Holbeck to the south of the city centre.

Councillors 

 indicates seat up for re-election.
* indicates incumbent councillor.

Elections since 2010

May 2022

May 2021

May 2019

May 2018

May 2016

May 2015

May 2014

May 2012

May 2011

May 2010

See also
Listed buildings in Leeds (Beeston and Holbeck Ward)

Notes

References

Wards of Leeds